Elections to North Tyneside Metropolitan Council took place on 3 May 2007 on the same day as other local council elections in England.

North Tyneside Council is elected "in thirds" which means one councillor from each three-member ward is elected each year for the first three years with a fourth year when the mayoral election takes place.

Against the national trend, the only gain was made by David Corkey of the Labour Party in Chirton Ward, from an Independent candidate, so the council remains in no overall control, but with the Conservative Party having the most councillors overall.

Battle Hill

Benton

Camperdown

Chirton

Collingwood

Cullercoats

Howdon

Killingworth

Longbenton

Monkseaton North

Monkseaton South

Northumberland

Preston

Riverside

St Mary's

A further by-election was held on 5 July 2007. Details can be found here.

Tynemouth

Valley

Wallsend

Weetslade

Whitley Bay

References 

2007 English local elections
2007
21st century in Tyne and Wear